Spassk is the name of several inhabited localities in Russia.

Modern localities
Urban localities
Spassk, Penza Oblast, a town in Spassky District of Penza Oblast
Spassk, Kemerovo Oblast, an urban-type settlement in Tashtagolsky District of Kemerovo Oblast; 

Rural localities
Spassk, Nizhny Novgorod Oblast, a village in Novoselsky Selsoviet of Vachsky District in Nizhny Novgorod Oblast
Spassk, Novosibirsk Oblast, a village in Kupinsky District of Novosibirsk Oblast
Spassk, Nazyvayevsky District, Omsk Oblast, a village in Utinsky Rural Okrug of Nazyvayevsky District in Omsk Oblast
Spassk, Sedelnikovsky District, Omsk Oblast, a village in Saratovsky Rural Okrug of Sedelnikovsky District in Omsk Oblast
Spassk, Ryazan Oblast, a village in Kermisinsky Rural Okrug of Shatsky District in Ryazan Oblast

Alternative names
Spassk, alternative name of Spasskoye, a selo in Spassky Selsoviet of Bolsheignatovsky District in the Republic of Mordovia;

See also
Spassk-Dalny, a town in Primorsky Krai
Spassk-Ryazansky, a town in Ryazan Oblast
Spas, Russia, several rural localities in Russia
Spassky (disambiguation)

https://vk.com/club16367686